Robert Coffey may refer to:

 Robert L. Coffey (1918–1949), U.S. Representative from Pennsylvania
 Robert J. Coffey (1842–1901), Canadian soldier and American Civil War Medal of Honor recipient